The Association of Prosecuting Attorneys (APA), founded in 2009, is a professional association of elected and appointed prosecutors in the United States. The APA's headquarters are in Washington, D.C.

The APA's mission is "to support and enhance the effectiveness of those in all areas of criminal justice and crime victim organizations in their efforts to create safer communities."

The association's goals are to support prosecutors and enhance their ability to perform their duties.

The APA is a national nonprofit organisation which was founded in 2009.

Programs and activities 
The APA oversees various programs to support the work of prosecutors in areas such as crime victim assistance, cruelty to animals and animal fighting, national security, gun violence, pre-trial services, juvenile justice, and domestic violence. The association provides training, technical assistance, and access to technology that aide in its prosecutorial functions.

Additionally, the association serves as an advocate for prosecutors in public policy matters and potential partnerships with other justice organizations.

Leadership and governance 
The APA is governed by a board of directors and managed by a president and chief executive officer (CEO).

The current chairperson of the board is Jean Peters Baker, Jackson County, Missouri district attorney. The current president and CEO is David LaBahn.

Positions on social and legal issues 
The APA has taken a public stance on matters such as discovery, castle doctrine, gun violence, juvenile justice, pretrial process, continuous alcohol monitoring, and animal cruelty crimes.

See also 

 American Bar Association
 Attorneys in the United States
 Law practice management
 National Lawyers Guild
 Practice of law

References

External links 
 

2009 establishments in Washington, D.C.
Legal organizations based in the United States
Organizations established in 2009
Professional associations based in the United States
Non-profit organizations based in Washington, D.C.
501(c)(3) organizations